Kepler-56 is a red giant in constellation Cygnus roughly  away with slightly more mass than the Sun.

Planetary system
In 2012, scientists discovered a 2-planet planetary system around Kepler-56 via the transit method. Asteroseismological studies revealed that the orbits of Kepler-56b and Kepler-56c are coplanar but about 45° misaligned to the host star's equator. In addition, follow-up radial velocity measurements showed evidence of a gravitational perturbator. It was confirmed in 2016 the perturbations are caused by third, non-transiting planet.

The planetary system is very compact but is dynamically stable.

The expanding star will devour Kepler-56b and Kepler-56c in 130 and 155 million years, respectively.

References

External links
 Kepler-56, The Open Exoplanet Catalogue
 Kepler 56, Exoplanet.eu

Cygnus (constellation)
1241
Planetary transit variables
K-type giants
Planetary systems with three confirmed planets